Fouad Ali El Himma (born 6 December 1962, in Ben Guerir, Morocco) is a Moroccan politician and senior advisor for Mohammed VI of whom he is said to be a very close friend. Since he became Secretary of State in the Ministry of the Interior in November 1999, he has played a prominent role in the Moroccan State. In 2008, he founded the Authenticity and Modernity Party. El Himma was a classmate of Mohammed VI at the Collège Royale and was the director of his cabinet when he was crown prince.

Education
He earned a BSc of Law from Mohammad V University in Rabat in 1986. He earned a Post Graduate Diploma in Political Science in 1988 and a Post Graduate Diploma in Administrative Science in 1989.

His training period in the Ministry of the Interior was 1986–1990.

Business
According to media reports, El Himma owns the firm Mena media consulting which held contracts with the Moroccan Ministry of the Interior. According to the press, the company conducts surveillance and intelligence gathering over social media platforms.

Brief history

1992–1997: Elected President of the Municipal Council for Ben Guerir (Morocco).

1992–1997: Parliamentary Deputy for Rahamneh Constituency (Morocco).

1997: Named Head of the Court of the Crown Prince (Morocco).

1999–2000: Secretary of State in the Ministry of the Interior (Morocco).

2002: Minister Delegate to the Interior (Morocco).

August 2007: Quit the Ministry of Interior to participate in the parliament election of September 2007

2008: founded the Authenticity and Modernity Party

Since December 2011: Counselor to His Majesty The King Mohammed VI of Morocco.

See also
Mounir Majidi
Yassine Mansouri

References

External links
 

1962 births
Living people
People from Marrakesh
Government ministers of Morocco
Authenticity and Modernity Party politicians
People from Ben Guerir
Moroccan businesspeople
Moroccan civil servants
Advisors of Mohammed VI of Morocco
Alumni of the Collège Royal (Rabat)
Mohammed V University alumni
Members of the Royal Cabinet of Mohammed VI of Morocco
People of Moroccan intelligence agencies